Tony Matthews is an Australian author and historian. His first book, This Dawning Land was completed in 1986.

He has written over thirty published books.

References 

People from Swansea
Australian historians
Living people
Year of birth missing (living people)